"Ausländer" is a song by American rock band Living Colour, recorded for their third album, Stain (1993), and released as its second single in April 1993. The term means foreigner(s) in German.

Charts

References

Living Colour songs
1993 songs
1993 singles
Epic Records singles
Protest songs
Songs against racism and xenophobia
Songs written by Corey Glover
Songs written by Doug Wimbish
Songs written by Vernon Reid
Songs written by Will Calhoun